Stefan Bergmeister (born 18 July 1996) is an Austrian football player. He plays for FC Kitzbühel.

Club career
He made his Austrian Football First League debut for SC Austria Lustenau on 9 September 2016 in a game against SC Wiener Neustadt.

References

External links
 

1996 births
People from St. Johann im Pongau District
Living people
Austrian footballers
Austria youth international footballers
Austrian expatriate footballers
1. FC Nürnberg II players
SC Austria Lustenau players
Floridsdorfer AC players
2. Liga (Austria) players
Austrian Regionalliga players
Regionalliga players
Association football fullbacks
Association football midfielders
Austrian expatriate sportspeople in Germany
Expatriate footballers in Germany
Footballers from Salzburg (state)